Franklin High School is a public high school in Franklin, Ohio, part of the Franklin City School District. It opened in 1969.

Demographics
The District provides the following information about the demographic breakdown of the 800 students enrolled in the school as of 2019:
White: 94.5%
Hispanic: 1.8%
Multiracial: 1.7%
Black: 1.0%
Asian: 0.7%
American Indian: 0.2%
Pacific Islands: 0.1%

300 students were eligible for free or reduced lunch.

Notable alumni
 Luke Kennard - professional basketball player
 Travis Lakins Sr. -professional baseball player

References

External links
 

High schools in Warren County, Ohio
Public high schools in Ohio